Unión Deportiva Villa de Santa Brígida B was a football team based in Santa Brígida in the autonomous community of Canary Islands.

Founded in 2004 and retired in 2009, the team played the 2008–09 season in the 3ª - Group 12. Its stadium is El Guiniguada with a capacity of 800 seats. It was the reserve team of UD Villa de Santa Brígida.

History
UD Villa de Santa Brígida was founded after the merger of CD Santa Brígida and SD Santa Brígida. While the first team took the place of CD Santa Brígida in Tercera División, the reserve side took the place of SD Santa Brígida in Regional Preferente de Las Palmas.

On 10 July 2009, UD Villa de Santa Brígida announced that reserve team will be dissolved and therefore not take part in Regional Preferente de Las Palmas.

Season to season

2 seasons in Tercera División

References

External links
UD Villa de Santa Brígida Official website
Club's history

Sport in Gran Canaria
Association football clubs established in 2004
Association football clubs disestablished in 2009
Spanish reserve football teams
Defunct football clubs in the Canary Islands
2004 establishments in Spain
2009 disestablishments in Spain